Seaborg may refer to:

Glenn T. Seaborg (1912–1999), American nuclear chemist, gave name to chemical element seaborgium
Helen L. Seaborg (1917–2006), American child welfare advocate and wife of Glenn T. Seaborg
David Seaborg (born 1949), American evolutionary biologist and activist, son of Glenn and Helen
Seaborg Home, family home of Glenn T. Seaborg, in South Gate, California
Seaborg Technologies, a Danish-based company developing small molten salt reactors

See also 
Seaborgium (106Sg), a chemical element
List of things named after Glenn T. Seaborg
Sjöberg (disambiguation)